Lecce is a historic city of 94,971 inhabitants (2022) in southern Italy. It is the capital of the province of Lecce, the province of second-highest population in the region of Apulia, as well as one of that region's most important cities. It is the main city of the Salentine Peninsula, a sub-peninsula at the heel of the Italian Peninsula, and is over 2,000 years old.

Because of the rich Baroque architectural monuments found in the city, Lecce is commonly nicknamed "The Florence of the South". In terms of industry, the "Lecce stone"—a particular kind of limestone—is one of the city's main exports, because it is very soft and workable, thus suitable for sculptures. Lecce is also an important agricultural centre, chiefly for its olive oil and wine production, as well as an industrial centre specializing in ceramic production.

Lecce is home to the University of Salento, founded in 1955 and enrolling more than 16,000 students as of 2017/18.

History

According to legend, a city called Sybar existed at the time of the Trojan War, founded by the Messapii. It was conquered by the Romans in the 3rd century BC, receiving the new name of Lupiae.

Under the emperor Hadrian (2nd century AD) the city was moved  to the northeast, taking the name of Licea or Litium. Lecce had a theater and an amphitheater and was connected to the Hadrian Port (the current San Cataldo). Orontius of Lecce, locally called Sant'Oronzo, is considered to have served as the city's first Christian bishop and is Lecce's patron saint.

After the fall of the Western Roman Empire, Lecce was sacked by the Ostrogoth king Totila in the Gothic Wars. It was restored to Roman rule in 549, and remained part of the Eastern Empire for five centuries, with brief conquests by Saracens and Lombards.

After the Norman conquest in the 11th century, Lecce regained commercial and political importance (count Tancred of Lecce was the last Norman King of Sicily), flourishing in the subsequent Hohenstaufen and Angevine rule. The County of Lecce was one of the largest and most important fiefs in the Kingdom of Sicily from 1053 to 1463, when it was annexed directly to the crown. From the 15th century, Lecce was one of the most important cities of southern Italy, and, starting in 1630, it was enriched with precious Baroque monuments. To avert invasion by the Ottomans, a new line of walls and a castle were built by Charles V (who was also Holy Roman Emperor), in the first part of the 16th century.

In 1656, a plague broke out in the city, killing a thousand inhabitants.

In 1943, fighter aircraft based in Lecce helped support isolated Italian garrisons in the Aegean Sea during World War 2. Because they were delayed by the Allies, they couldn't prevent a defeat. In 1944 and 1945, B-24 long-range bombers of the 98th Heavy Bomber Group attached to the 15th U.S. Army Air Force were based in Lecce, from where the crews flew missions over Italy, the Balkans, Austria, Germany and France.

Main sights

Churches and religious buildings
 Church of the Holy Cross: Construction of the Chiesa di Santa Croce) was begun in 1353, but work halted until 1549, and it was completed only by 1695. The church has a richly decorated façade with animals, grotesque figures and vegetables, and a large rose window. Next to the church is the Government Palace, a former convent.
 San Niccolò and Cataldo: The church is an example of Italo-Norman architecture. It was founded by Tancred of Sicily in 1180. In 1716 the façade was rebuilt, with the addition of numerous statues, but maintaining the original Romanesque portal. The walls were frescoed during the 15th-17th centuries.
 Celestine Convent: Built (1549–1695) in Baroque-style by Giuseppe Zimbalo. The courtyard was designed by Gabriele Riccardi.
 Santa Irene: This church was commissioned in 1591 by the Theatines and dedicated to Saint Irene. The architect was Francesco Grimaldi). It has a large façade showing different styles in the upper and lower parts. Above the portal stands a statue of Ste Irene (1717) by Mauro Manieri. The interior is on the Latin cross plan and is rather sober. The main altarpiece is a copy of the St Michael the Archangel by Guido Reni. The high altar has a Transport of the Holy Ark by Oronzo Tiso. In the right transept is one of the largest altars in Lecce, dedicated to Saint Cajetan (1651). Nearby is the Rococo altar of Saint Andrew Avellino. Also from the mid-17th century is the Altar of St Orontius by Francesco Antonio Zimbalo, followed by the altar of Saint Irene with a canvas by Giuseppe Verrio (1639), nine busts of saints housing relics and a large statue of the saint. The altar of Saint Stephen has the Stoning of St. Stephen by Verrio.
 San Matteo: This church was built in 1667. It has a typical central Italy Baroque style. It has two columns on the façade, only one of which is decorated, though only partially. According to a local legend, the jealous devil killed the sculptor before he could finish the work.
 Santa Maria degli Angeli
 Santa Chiara: This church was built in 1429–1438, rebuilt in 1687.
 San Francesco della Scarpa: Known as the "church without façade" as the latter has been demolished in the 19th century restorations. The most ancient section dates likely to the 13th-14th centuries; the interior is on the Greek Cross plan. Notable are several Baroque altars and a large statue of Saint Joseph.

Other buildings
 Column of statue of St Oronzo: (Lecce's patron) was given to Lecce by the city of Brindisi, because Saint Oronzo was reputed to have cured the plague in Brindisi. The column was one of a pair that marked the end of the Appian Way, the main road between Rome and southern Italy.
 Torre del Parco ("Park Tower") is one of the medieval symbols of Lecce. It was erected in 1419 by the then-18 year old Giovanni Antonio Del Balzo Orsini, prince of Lecce. The whole complex was the seat of Orsini's tribunal and of a mint, and after Giovanni Antonio's death, it became a residence for the Spanish viceroys.
 Palazzo Sedile: Palace was built in 1592 and was used by the local council until 1852.
 Castle of Charles V: built in 1539–49 by Gian Giacomo dell'Acaja. It has a trapezoidal plan with angular bastions. It is attached to the Politeama Greco Opera House, inaugurated on 15 November 1884.
 Triumphal Arch (Arco di Trionfo, commonly called Porta Napoli, "Neapolitan Gate") which is one of the three gates to enter Lecce's historical city centre, erected in 1548 in honor of Charles V. It replaced an older gate, Porta S. Giusto, which, according to tradition, lay over the tomb of the namesake saint. Also built over pre-existing medieval gates are the current Porta San Biagio ("St. Blaise Gate") and the Porta Rudiae which are the other two gates to Lecce's Historical city centre. Both are in Baroque style, the latter having the statue of St. Oronzo on the top and mythological figures on the sides.
 Palazzo dei Celestini, now seat of the Province of Lecce. It was built in 1659–95 and designed by Giuseppe Zimbalo.
 The city's obelisk, erected in 1822 in honour of Ferdinand I of the Two Sicilies.

Gardens and parks
 Orto Botanico di Lecce, a botanical garden.

Archaeology
 The Roman 2nd century amphitheatre, situated near Sant'Oronzo Square, was able to seat more than 25,000 people. It is now half-buried because other monuments were built above it over the centuries. The theatre is currently used for different religious and arts events.
 The archaeological museum Sigismondo Castromediano.
 The archaeological museum Faggiano.
 The archaeological park of Rudiae, three kilometres south-west of the city but within its limits. The place was identified as the former home of the poet Ennius by the Renaissance Humanist, Antonio de Ferraris, who was from the region. This was once the more important city until Roman times and has an amphitheatre of its own, a necropolis and remains of substantial walls. The Porta Rudiae, built on the road leading from this site, is named after it.

Geography

Climate
Lecce experiences a Mediterranean climate (Köppen climate classification Csa).

Sport
 
Lecce is home to Serie A (the highest football division in Italy) football club U.S. Lecce. Since 1966, they have played at the 33,786-seater Stadio Via del Mare.

Transportation
Lecce is served by Lecce railway station.  The local public transport includes trolleybus service, introduced in 2012.

People

 Antonio Amantea (1894–1983), World War I fighter ace
 Scipione Ammirato (1531–1601), historian and philosopher
 Abraham de Balmes (c. 1450–1523), Jewish physician and translator
 Carmelo Bene (1937–2002), actor, film director and screenwriter
 Vittorio Bodini (1914–1970), poet and translator
 Massimo Bray (born 1959), intellectual, academic publisher and politician, former director of the Italian Encyclopaedia of Science, Letters, and Arts (Enciclopedia Treccani), who served in the government of Italy as Minister of Culture 
 Ennio Capasa (born 1960), fashion designer, creator of the Italian fashion house CoSTUME NATIONAL
 Franco Causio (born 1949), retired footballer, 1982 FIFA World Cup winner
 Antonio Conte (born 1969), retired footballer, former manager of Juventus F.C., Chelsea F.C and Italian football team. Current manager of Tottenham Hotspur.
 Francesco Danieli (born 1981), historian and iconologist
 Cosimo De Giorgi (1842–1922), scientist
 Ennio De Giorgi (1928–1996), mathematician
 Cloe Elmo (1910–1962), opera singer
 Quintus Ennius (c. 239–169 BC), Roman writer and poet
 Vito Fazzi (1851–1918), physician and hospital founder
 Barbara Lezzi (born 1972), politician, who served in the government of Italy as Minister for the South
 Marco Materazzi (born 1973), retired footballer, 2006 FIFA World Cup winner
 Gabriele Poso (born 1978), independent artist, musician and composer
 Michelangelo Schipa (1854–1939), writer, historian and scholar
 Tito Schipa (1888–1965), tenor
 Filippo Smaldone (1848–1923), Catholic priest and saint
 Antonio Verrio (c. 1636–1707), painter in England

Twin towns – sister cities

Lecce is twinned with:
 Murcia, Spain, since 2004
 Skopje, North Macedonia, since 2005
 Ostrów Wielkopolski, Poland, since 2006
 Valladolid, Spain, since 2009
 Amasya, Turkey

See also
 Roman Catholic Archdiocese of Lecce
 Punta San Cataldo di Lecce Lighthouse

Notes

References

External links 

  

 
Cities and towns in Apulia
Localities of Salento
200s BC establishments